The 1986 NCAA Division II women's basketball tournament was the fifth annual tournament hosted by the NCAA to determine the national champion of Division II women's  collegiate basketball in the United States.

Defending champions Cal Poly Pomona defeated North Dakota State in the championship game, 70–63, the Broncos' third NCAA Division II national title. 

The championship rounds were contested at the Springfield Civic Center in Springfield, Massachusetts, hosted by Springfield College.

Regionals

East

Great Lakes

New England

North Central

South

South Atlantic

South Central

West

National Finals - Springfield, Massachusetts
Visiting team listed first and date March 15 in Elite Eight unless indicated

Final Four Location: Springfield Civic Center Host: Springfield College

All-tournament team
 Debra Larsen, Cal Poly Pomona
 Michelle McCoy, Cal Poly Pomona
 Vickie Mitchell, Cal Poly Pomona
 Janice Woods, North Dakota State
 Pat Smykowski, North Dakota State
 Vincene Morris, Philadelphia Textile

See also
1986 NCAA Division II men's basketball tournament
1986 NCAA Division I women's basketball tournament
1986 NCAA Division III women's basketball tournament
1986 NAIA women's basketball tournament

References
 1986 NCAA Division II women's basketball tournament jonfmorse.com

 
NCAA Division II women's basketball tournament
1986 in sports in Massachusetts